This is a list of episodes of the British television series Kingdom. The first series aired on ITV in 2007, the second in 2008. The third series was aired in 2009. As of the end of Series 3, 18 episodes have been broadcast.

Episodes

Series 1 (2007)

Series 2 (2008)

Series 3 (2009)
Metin Hüseyin and Edward Hall return to direct Series 3. The episodes were written by Alan Whiting, Jeff Povey and Guy Burt.

References

"Kingdom Series 3 press pack". ITV Press Centre. Retrieved on 29 May 2009.
Weekly Terrestrial Television Ratings Report from the Broadcasters' Audience Research Board

Kingdom episodes